Viva Air Perú S.A.C. is a Peruvian low-cost carrier. It was created by Irelandia Aviation, which also developed similar carriers Viva Air Colombia and Mexico's VivaAerobús, the latter of which has no legal affiliation with the other "Viva" brands.

History
In November 2016, William Shaw and José Castellanos announced the entry of a new low-cost airline in Perú, to operate in the first quarter of 2017 by the Peruvian company Viva Air Perú through the integration of the Viva group and Irelandia Aviation. Both detailed that this new company would have two Airbus A320-200s from Viva Air Colombia, at a cost of 60 soles per segment and with eight national destinations, estimating that a number of 700 thousand passengers would be transported in its first year of operation.

On January 19, 2017, the company obtained from the Ministry of Transport and Communications the operating permit for regular national air transport of passengers, cargo and mail for a period of four years. Also clarifying that they'll wait for the delivery of the air operator certificate that is estimated to arrive before April 11. Likewise, José Castellanos also explained that the prices would be made by sections.

On February 27, 2023, Viva Air Perú and its parent company suspended their operations indefinitely and grounded their entire fleet due to the financial crisis, blaming the situation on the delay on the response from Aerocivil on the Avianca-Viva merger authorization, stating that "The (civil aviation authority's) unprecedented decision will result in further delays in reaching a decision, for which Viva is forced to announce, unfortunately, the suspension of its operations with immediate effect.

Destinations
As of December 2022, Viva Air Perú flies to destinations across Perú and Colombia.

Fleet

Viva Air Perú operated a single Airbus A320 from its Colombian counterpart Viva Air Colombia, maintaining the same Colombian registries by the current operating agreements, as of December 2022:

See also
List of low-cost airlines
List of airlines of Peru

References

External links
Official page

Defunct airlines of Peru
Companies of Peru
Airlines established in 2016
Airlines disestablished in 2023
2016 establishments in Peru
2023 disestablishments in Peru
Defunct low-cost airlines